Saco Transportation Center, also referred to as Saco or Saco–Biddeford in some timetables, is a passenger transportation station in Saco, Maine served by Amtrak, the national railroad passenger system, and other transportation providers.  On average, about 110 passengers daily board or detrain Amtrak's Downeaster service at the station, making it the third-busiest stop in Maine. The station is located next to the Pan Am Railways mainline, formerly the Western Route mainline of the Boston & Maine Railroad.

The train platform was constructed in 2001, and the station building was constructed in 2008 and opened in 2009. The station, at 138 Main Street, is owned by the city of Saco. The station is notable for being the first green design train station in the U.S.; when it was built, it featured a wind turbine for electricity, geothermal heating and cooling systems, and a roof made from recycled soda bottles. However, the wind turbine, which cost the city of Saco about $200,000, did not produce the expected amount of electricity, and was shut down in 2006 after safety concerns. It was removed in November 2018.

References

Gallery

External links 

Saco – Amtrak Downeaster
Saco-Biddeford Amtrak Station – USA Rail Guide (TrainWeb)

Amtrak stations in Maine
Stations along Boston and Maine Railroad lines
Transportation buildings and structures in York County, Maine
Buildings and structures in Saco, Maine
Buildings and structures in Biddeford, Maine